Events from the year 1157 in Ireland.

Incumbents
 High King: Muirchertach Mac Lochlainn

Events
Completion and consecration of Mellifont Abbey, the first Cistercian foundation in Ireland.
The earliest Irish land charter to survive is that of the grant in 1157 of land to the Cistercians in Newry, which lay in Uí Echach, by the High King Muirchertach Mac Lochlainn

Births

Deaths

References